North Western Hotel, or variations on the name, applies to a number of hotels:

Northwestern Hotel (Des Moines, Iowa)
North Western Hotel, Liverpool
North-Western Hotel, Livingstone
North Western Hotel, Morecambe